The Jim Henson Company Presents The Sam Plenty Cavalcade of Action Show Plus Singing! is a live action web-series from the Jim Henson Company. The series was created and directed by Paul Rugg and Mitch Schauer.

Synopsis
The series is designed as a Western comedy musical with science-fiction and action adventure elements, starring cowboy hero Sam Plenty. Victor Yerrid described Sam Plenty in a 2007 interview as "a throwback to the old Gene Autry Show". In particular, the premise recalls Autry's 1935 serial The Phantom Empire, in which Autry and friends must battle an evil queen, robots, and various sci-fi devices.

The show is an over-the-top tongue-in-cheek parody of classic television serials. The first serial in "The Sam Plenty Cavalcade of Action Show Plus Singing!" was titled "Sam Plenty in Underdoom". The first installment of the five-episode serial debuted on the web on March 10, 2008 (although adding the parody element, the episodes begin at "part 3").

The cast consists of a mixture of television and film actors. The Sam Plenty troupe also includes several veteran Henson puppeteers includes Yerrid (as Bob Choppy), Drew Massey (as Sam Plenty), and Allan Trautman (as the professor). Emmy-winning composers Julie and Steve Bernstein (Animaniacs, Pinky and the Brain, and many others) wrote the music for the series.  A sample of the project was screened at the 2007 San Diego Comic-Con.

Episode list

Cast
 Drew Massey as Samuel "Sam" Plenty
 Zand Broumand as Sergeant Yak Munch
 Jeffrey Cannata as Doom Rider
 Stephanie Denise Griffin as Marion Weadle
 Golda Inquito as Hanalei
 Jay Mawhinney as Lord Grand Chapeau
 Dan Mott as William "Billy" Weadle
 Marie O'Donnell as Queen Verbosa
 Jerry Trainor as Fetcheye
 Allan Trautman as Professor August Weadle
 Victor Yerrid as Robert "Bob" Choppy

References

External links
 Sam Plenty news
 Henson Company press release - March 10, 2008
 "Meet Sam Plenty" Henson.com Podcast - March 10, 2008

The Jim Henson Company
Internet properties established in 2008
Film serials
Science fiction Westerns
American comedy web series
Parodies of television shows
American science fiction web series
Television series by The Jim Henson Company